Channel [V] Thailand was a music television channel.

In August 2008 Channel [V] Thailand moved studio and office from Sukhumvit 49/12 to Siam Discovery on 6th floor.

Channel [V] Thailand ended its exclusive broadcasting deal with TrueVision on 31 August 2013, moving over to CTH, and discontinuing all VJ-presented programming.

History 

Channel [V] Thailand started in 1996 by joint venture between STAR TV and Broadcasting Network Thailand (BNT). At present, Channel [V] Thailand was joint ventured by STAR TV (49%), TrueVisions (26%) and GMM Media (24%) since 2007.

Channel [V] Thailand was the oldest music channel in Thailand and produced most of its shows locally with the exception of the America's Next Top Model. It ceases operations on October 1, 2021.

Presenters and VJs

Final VJs
 Non VJs ( Cancel Live Program )

Former VJs 
 B  Bandit Saokaew
 Boss  Chatchavalit Sirisab
 Chai  Chartayodom Hiranyasthiti
 Earth San Ittisuknanth
 Emme  Amika Boohert
 Helen Prathumrat Berger
 Jenny Genevieve Jane Irwin
 "Janeen" Janeen Lyons
 Loukade Metinee Kingpayome
 Louk-Tarn Supamat Phahulo
 Meaw Autcharra Sinratchar-tarnon
 Nadia Nadia Nimitvanich
 Sunny Sunissa Brown
 Ta-Ngaew Bussaba Mahatthapong
 Team Kosin  Piyakittiphaibun
 Terng  Pradorn Sirakovit
 Michael Sirachuch Chienthaworn
 Nax Charlie Potjes
 Alex Bin Alexandre
 Bank Puttipong Kongsomsaksakul
 Bas Panupat Sulanlayalak
 Ake  Eakachai Waricharaporn
 Ja  Natthaweeranuch Thongmee
 Kwan Sirikwan Chinnachot
 Loukade  Jirada Yohara
 Mike Michael Kenneth Wong
 Paula   Paula Taylor
 Pitta  Pitta na Patalung
 Woonsen  Virithipa Pakdeeprasong

Shows on Channel [V] Thailand

Final shows
 [V] Boutique
 [V] Countdown  (VJ Pitta)
 [V] REDioactive
 [V] Tunes
 Asian Chart (VJ Mike) 
 Asian Hero (VJ Mike) 
 Club [V]
 Double Shot
 Melosamosorn เมโลสโมสร
 Siam Top 20 (VJ Loukade)
 The Record Shop
 The Ticket (VJ Loukade)
 To Ma Dauy Kan โตมาด้วยกัน (VJ Ja)
 Zog Zag (VJ Loukade, Bank, Pitta)

Final Special shows
 [V] Covery 
 [V] Play & Learn +
 [V] Tour Free
 [V] Style
 [V] Special
 Channel [V] Thailand Music Video Awards (Live, Special)
 America's Next Top Model, Cycle 11
 [V] Get Physical
 Daisy Does America
 Love Parade (Live)

Former shows
 Big Breakfast (live) (VJ Bee, VJ Boss)
 Remote Control (live) (VJ Loukade, VJ Boss, VJ Pitta, VJ Ja, VJ Emme)
 [V] Play Zone (live)
 [V] Life Begin (live)
 [V] 100 Rock (VJ Pitta)
 [V] All in Spy (VJ Loukade)
 [V] Countdown [inter] Program from Channel [V] International
 [V] Federventure (VJ Eke, VJ Ja)
 [V] Radioactive (VJ Boss)
 [V] Vital (VJ Chai)
 [V].i.d (VJ Loukade)
 4 Play
 Eaststree (VJ Pitta)
 Flava
 Hei-Beat (VJ Terng)
 House Of Noise (VJ Boss)
 Let [V] Entertain U
 Main Stage
 Night Life
 Popparazzi (VJ Paula)
 Rated Weekend
 Rewind
 Smash Hit
 Soundtrack
 Trendy Taste
 The Interview
 The Rock Show
 Turn On [V]
 VideoScope (VJ Chai)
 [V] 365 Music
 [V] Vote
 Khon Du Pen Yai คนดูเป็นใหญ่
 I Am Siam
 [V] Japan Bravo

Studio and office 
In August 2008 channel [V] Thailand moved studio and office from Sukhumvit 49/12 to Siam Discovery shopping mall complex. The new studio name is "[V] Spot".

Channel [V] Thailand Music Video Awards

Program highlights

Of the month 
 The Chosen One
 Spotlight
 Singled Out
 Asian No. 1 Pop
 The Bird Eyes [V]iew
 Trendy Taste

Of the week 
 Yip Chin  Phleng Man  (Hot Pick, หยิบชิ้น เพลงมันส์)
 Phleng  Khao  (New Add, เพลงเข้า)

Activity 
 Channel [V] Thailand's Music Video Awards
 Channel [V] Thailand VJ Search Project
 Channel [V] Thailand & ACER Unwire Campus Tour 2007
 Channel [V] Thailand's Grand Opening "[V] Spot" @ Siam Discovery
 Channel [V] Thailand Presents  Ibis Idol Contest 2009
 European Union Presents EU Green Dats Concert 2009, Bangkok

See also 
 Channel [V]
 STAR TV
 True Visions
 MTV Thailand

External links
Channel V Thailand

References

Television stations in Thailand
Music television channels
Television channels and stations established in 1996
Television channels and stations disestablished in 2021
1996 establishments in Thailand
2021 disestablishments in Thailand
Music organizations based in Thailand
Former subsidiaries of The Walt Disney Company